V21 or V.21 may refer to :

 ITU V.21, an ITU-T modem recommendation for full-duplex communication between two analogue dial-up modems
 Fokker V.21, a German Fokker D.VII prototype with tapered wings
 Venture 21, an American sailboat design